This is a list of airlines that have an air operator's certificate issued by the civil aviation authority of Angola, the Instituto Nacional de Aviação Civil.

Airlines of Angola

See also

 List of defunct airlines of Angola
 List of airports in Angola
 List of airlines
 List of air carriers banned in the European Union

References

Angola
Airlines
Airlines
Angola